Gary Lamar Walker (born February 28, 1973) is a former American football defensive end who played eleven seasons in the National Football League (NFL).  He played college football for Auburn University, and was selected in the fifth round of the 1995 NFL Draft by the Houston Oilers.  He also played for the Tennessee Oilers, Jacksonville Jaguars, and Houston Texans.

College 
He accumulated 148 tackles and 15 sacks in two seasons at Auburn University, earning second-team All-Southeastern Conference honors as a senior. Before Auburn, he attended Hinds Junior College.

Professional 
He was drafted in the 1995 NFL Draft by the Houston Oilers. Acquired by the Jacksonville Jaguars in 1999, he was an alternate selection to the 2001 Pro Bowl. Signed by the Houston Texans in 2002, he was selected to the Pro Bowl in that year, though he was subsequently plagued by injuries. Walker severed his triceps muscle during the 2005 season and was waived by the Texans in March 2006.
He was the only Houston Oilers player to play for the Houston Texans.

NFL Stats

Key
 GP: games played
 COMB: combined tackles
 TOTAL: total tackles
 AST: assisted tackles
 SACK: sacks
 FF: forced fumbles
 FR: fumble recoveries

Personal life 
Walker's son Gary Jr. played college football for the Auburn Tigers and is now a graduate assistant for the program.

References

1973 births
Living people
American football defensive tackles
American football defensive ends
Hinds Eagles football players
Auburn Tigers football players
Houston Oilers players
Tennessee Oilers players
Jacksonville Jaguars players
Houston Texans players
American Conference Pro Bowl players
Players of American football from Georgia (U.S. state)
People from Royston, Georgia